Uzma Hassan is a Pakistani actress who appears in Urdu films and serials. She made her film debut with a  romantic-drama film Arth (2018) for which she received critical acclaim and nomination for Best Actress at Lux Style Awards.

Filmography

References

External links 

20th-century Pakistani actresses
Living people
1979 births